Tarerach (also Tarérach) is a commune in the Pyrénées-Orientales department in southern France.

Geography 
Tarerach is located in the canton of La Vallée de l'Agly and in the arrondissement of Prades.

Population

See also
Communes of the Pyrénées-Orientales department

References

Communes of Pyrénées-Orientales